is a passenger railway station located in the city of Kodaira, Tokyo, Japan, operated by the private railway operator Seibu Railway.

Lines

Station layout
The station has two ground-level side platforms serving two tracks. The station building and entrance is located on the west side of the station, and the platforms are connected by an underpass.

Platforms

History
Takanodai Station opened on 21 October 1948.

Station numbering was introduced on all Seibu Railway lines during fiscal 2012, with Takanodai Station becoming "SK03".

Passenger statistics
In fiscal 2019, the station was the 39th busiest on the Seibu network with an average of 25,914 passengers daily. 

The passenger figures for previous years are as shown below.

Surrounding area
 Musashino Art University
 Korea University
 Tsuda College

See also
List of railway stations in Japan

References

External links

 Seibu station information 

Stations of Seibu Railway
Railway stations in Tokyo
Railway stations in Japan opened in 1948
Seibu Kokubunji Line
Kodaira, Tokyo